Norpsilocin (4-HO-NMT) is tryptamine alkaloid recently discovered in 2017 in the psychedelic mushroom Psilocybe cubensis. It is hypothesized to be a dephosphorylated metabolite of baeocystin. Norpsilocin was found to be a full agonist of 5-HT2A receptor. It is also more potent than psilocin.

See also 
 Norbaeocystin

References 

Tryptamine alkaloids
Secondary amines